Dennis Lippert (born 20 February 1996) is a German professional footballer who plays as a left-back for  club SpVgg Bayreuth.

Honours
SpVgg Bayreuth
 Regionalliga Bayern: 2021–22

References

1996 births
Living people
1. FC Nürnberg II players
1. FC Nürnberg players
2. Bundesliga players
3. Liga players
Association football defenders
Footballers from Bavaria
German footballers
People from Weiden in der Oberpfalz
Regionalliga players
SpVgg Bayreuth players
Sportspeople from the Upper Palatinate